I Got Mine may refer to:  
 "I Got Mine" (Motörhead song), a 1983 song by English hard rock band Motörhead
 "I Got Mine" (The Black Keys song), a 2008 song by blues-rock band The Black Keys
 "I Got Mine", a song recorded by Frank Stokes in 1928, later recorded by:
 Pink Anderson on Medicine Show Man
 Ry Cooder on Chicken Skin Music

See also
 "I've Got Mine", the second single by English rock band Small Faces